The 1956–57 Scottish Inter-District Championship was a  rugby union competition for Scotland's district teams.

This season saw the fourth formal Scottish Inter-District Championship.

A notable selection for Glasgow District this season was that of Noel Bowden, a capped All Black from New Zealand,

South and Edinburgh District won the competition with two wins and a loss each.

1956-57 League Table

Results

Round 1

Glasgow District: 

South:

Round 2

South: 

North and Midlands:

Round 3

 North and Midlands: 

Edinburgh District:

Round 4

Glasgow District: 

Edinburgh District:

Round 5

North and Midlands: 

Glasgow District:

Round 6

South: 

Edinburgh District:

References

1956–57 in Scottish rugby union
1956–57